Himekanvas is the first full length original album released by Himeka under her new label Sony Music Japan International under the mononym HIMEKA on November 2, 2011.
The album has 2 versions: A CD-only version and a limited CD+DVD version. The CD+DVD version contains a DVD of all her PVs, and on the CD it has 2 cover songs: one song she sang in her final at the Animax Anison Grand Prix, and the other is a piano version of her own song "Asu e no Kizuna".

Track list

Charts

References 

2011 albums
Japanese-language albums
Himeka albums